Irene Luxbacher (born December 10, 1970 in Toronto, Ontario) is a Canadian artist, an author and children's book illustrator.

After graduating with a degree in Art History from Queen's University, she studied Fine Art (specifically drawing and painting) at Emily Carr University of Art and Design. She has a background in art education and has led visual arts workshops in Public schools in Toronto and at The Avenue Road Arts School.  Both the Jumbo Books and the Starting Art Series have received much critical acclaim and reviews from librarians, teachers and parents, particularly homeschooling parents.

Irene was a finalist for the 2009 Governor General's Awards
for her illustrations found in The Imaginary Garden published by Kids Can Press (text by Andrew Larsen).

Irene lives in Toronto, Ontario, Canada.

Works

Picture books

As author and illustrator 

Mattoo, Let's Play!, 2010
Mr. Frank, 2014
Deep Underwater, 2018

As illustrator 

The Imaginary Garden, 2009; written by Andrew Larsen
Malaika's Costume, 2016; written by Nadia L. Hohn
The Not-So-Faraway Adventure, 2016; written by Andrew Larsen
Malaika's Winter Carnival, 2017; written by Nadia L. Hohn
Treasure, 2019; written by Mireille Messier
Aunt Pearl, 2019; written by Monica Kulling
Malaika's Surprise, 2021; written by Nadia L. Hohn

Activity books

As author and illustrator 

The Jumbo Book of Art, 2003
The Jumbo Book of Outdoor Art, 2006 
I Can Paint!, 2007 
I Can Sculpt!, 2007 
I Can Draw!, 2008 
I Can Make Prints!, 2008 
I Can Build!, 2009 
I Can Collage!, 2009

Awards 

The Imaginary Garden
2010 USBBY Outstanding International Books Honour List
2009 The Governor General's Literary Awards, finalist

123 I Can Paint!
2008 CCBC Best Books for Kids and Teens, winner
2007 Ontario Library Association Best Bets Non-Fiction, winner

123 I Can Sculpt!
2008 CCBC Best Books for Kids and Teens, winner

The Jumbo Book of Art
2004 Disney Adventures Book Award, winner, best hands-on book
2003 National Parenting Publications Awards (NAPPA) for Children's Resources, Gold Award winner
2003 Best Bets, Ontario Library Association

The Jumbo Book of Outdoor Art
2006 Disney Adventures Book Award, shortlisted
The Not-So-Faraway Adventure
 2016 Best Books for Kids and Teens, Canadian Children's Book Centre, Winner

References

External links 

 Author's Website
 Profile on Goodreads
 Facebook Fan Page

1970 births
Living people
Artists from Toronto
Canadian children's book illustrators
Canadian women artists
Canadian women illustrators
Canadian children's writers
Writers from Toronto